Gabrielona pisinna, common name the tiny pheasant, is a species of small sea snail with calcareous opercula, a marine gastropod mollusk in the family Phasianellidae, the pheasant snails.

Description
The size of the shell varies between 0.34 mm and 1.1 mm.

Distribution
This species occurs in the Indian Ocean off Mauritius and in the Pacific Ocean off New Caledonia

References

External links
 To Barcode of Life (2 barcodes)
 To GenBank (4 nucleotides; 2 proteins)
 To World Register of Marine Species
 

Phasianellidae
Gastropods described in 1973